The 15th National Congress of the Chinese Communist Party (Simplified Chinese:  中国共产党第十五次全国代表大会) was held in Beijing between September 12 and 18, 1997. It was preceded by the 14th National Congress of the Chinese Communist Party. It was followed by the 16th National Congress of the Chinese Communist Party. 2,048 delegates and 60 specially invited delegates elected a 344-member 15th CCP Central Committee, as well as a 115-member Central Commission for Discipline Inspection (CCDI). This change in membership made the new average age of the CCP 55 and percentage of members holding university or college level education 92.4%. Jiang Zemin was reappointed CCP General Secretary and Chairman of the Central Military Commission.

Changes to the constitution
The constitution was changed to make Deng Xiaoping Theory a guiding ideology of the Chinese Communist Party alongside Marxism-Leninism and Mao Zedong Thought. It was revealed in a presentation by Jiang Zemin that an All-Round Advancement would be adopted toward the Cause of Building Socialism with Chinese Characteristics well into the 21st Century.

References 

1997 conferences
1997 elections in China
1997 in politics
National Congress of the Chinese Communist Party